Charles Pierre Latourette (July 21, 1945 – December 21, 1982) was a National Football League punter and return specialist.

Early years
Latourette attended Jonesboro high school where he played football. Latourette was an All-American and All-Southwest Conference as a defensive back.

Professional career
In 1967, Latourette signed with the St. Louis Cardinals and selected as the Cardinals' Rookie of the Year. On September 29, 1968, Latourette set the NFL record for punt return average in a single game against the New Orleans Saints.

Retirement
In 1972, Latourette announced his retirement from the National Football League following his graduation of the University of Tennessee as a medical student where he attended during his career in the National Football League.

Death
On December 21, 1982, Latourette died from a single gunshot wound to his eye in the bedroom of his apartment. Latourette was a radiologist at the time of his death. Prior to his death, on July 30, 1981, Latourette previously survived a hang gliding accident in which he suffered broken arms and ribs.

References

External links
Latourette's profile

1945 births
1982 deaths
Players of American football from San Antonio
American football punters
Rice Owls football players
St. Louis Cardinals (football) players
Deaths by firearm in Texas